Saint James and Saint Lucy Predella is a circa 1426 to 1428 series of five tempera on panel paintings by Beato Angelico. Together, and possibly with other unknown paintings, they formed the predella to a single altarpiece, now lost or not clearly identified. They are dated on the basis of stylistic motifs and they cannot be later than 1435, when Andrea di Giusto copied Naming in the predella of his own altarpiece now in the Museo civico in Prato.

History
Naming and Funeral were recorded in 1778 as belonging to the art dealer Giovanni Vincenzo Frati, who in January that year proposed that Giuseppe Pelli purchase them for the Uffizi, of which Pelli was the director.  It has been theorised that there was an unknown altarpiece by Angelico in Santa Lucia dei Magnoli in Florence.

List
St James the Great Frees Hermogenes, 26,8x23,8 cm, Fort Worth, Kimbell Art Museum
Naming of John the Baptist, 26x52,9 cm, Museo Nazionale di San Marco
Funeral of the Virgin Mary, Philadelphia Museum of Art
St Dominic Meets St Francis, 26x26,7 cm, California Palace of the Legion of Honor, San Francisco
St Lucy's Vision of Saint Agatha, private collection of Richard L. Feigen, New York

Panels

References

1428 paintings
Paintings by Fra Angelico
Paintings depicting John the Baptist
Paintings of Francis of Assisi
Paintings of Saint Lucy
Paintings depicting Agatha of Sicily
Paintings of Saint Dominic
Paintings of James the Great
Paintings of the Virgin Mary
Paintings in the collection of the Kimbell Art Museum
Paintings in the collection of the Philadelphia Museum of Art
Paintings in the collection of the Fine Arts Museums of San Francisco